The Principality of Tver was a principality or duchy, which existed between the 13th and the 15th centuries. It was one of the states established after the decay of the Kievan Rus', and in the 13th century Tver rivaled the Principality of Moscow and aimed to become the center of the united Russian state. Eventually it lost, decayed, and in 1485 was annexed by the Grand Duchy of Moscow. The principality was located approximately in the area currently occupied by Tver Oblast and the eastern part of Smolensk Oblast of Russia. The capital of the principality was Tver.

History

In the 1230s or the 1240s, Yaroslav Vsevolodovich, the Grand Prince of Vladimir, detached the city of Tver from Principality of Pereyaslavl-Zalessky where it previously belonged and gave it to his son Alexander Nevsky. In 1246, another son of Yaroslav, Yaroslav of Tver, became the Prince of Tver, and the principality was ruled by his descendants until 1485, when it was abolished. In 1264, Yaroslav was appointed the Grand Prince of Vladimir, which at the time meant he was the supreme authority of all north-western Russia. In the 13th century, Principality of Tver was less dependent from the Golden Horde than other Russian principalities were, and its population grew up. The combination of these two factors led to the rivalry between Tver and Moscow, each of which were trying to become the most influential Russian principality.

In 1285, Mikhail of Tver, a son of Yaroslav of Tver, succeeded his father and became the Prince of Tver. In 1305 he became the Grand Prince of Vladimir as well, however, Öz Beg Khan of the Golden Horde decided that Tver became too strong, and supported Moscow against Tver. Mikhail was summoned to the Golden Horde and executed there in 1318. His son and successor, Dmitry of Tver, was executed in the Golden Horde in 1326, and another son and also a prince of Tver, Aleksandr Mikhailovich of Tver, was executed there in 1339 as well together with his son Fyodor. In 1327, there was an anti-Tatar uprising in Principality of Tver, which was suppressed. The city of Tver was burned down, and the principality lost a considerable part of its population. Tver never recovered from that, and eventually Moscow, which managed to remain on good terms with Tatars, absorbed all surrounding principalities and eventually became the capital of Russia.

In the 14th century, some parts of the principality were temporarily given away as appanage. This created the whole system of principalities dependent on Tver. These included Principality of Kashin, Principality of Kholm, and Principality of Zubtsov. Some of them became independent to the point that they conducted war with Tver.

In 1371, Mikhail II of Tver was the last Prince of Tver ever appointed as the Grand Prince of Vladimir. The reign of Mikhail is usually considered as the last period when Tver still could rival Moscow and oppose the Golden Horde. Mikhail II sided with the Grand Duchy of Lithuania against Moscow, which eventually led to all Russian princes starting a war against Tver in 1375. Mikhail lost and had to recognize the supremacy of the Grand Prince of Moscow, at the time Dmitry Donskoy. Whereas he managed to gain full independence for Tver shortly afterwards, the Principality of Tver never was able again to rival Moscow. In the 1470s, Mikhail III of Tver had to sign a number of treaties with Moscow (ruled by Ivan III of Russia) which essentially discriminated against Tver. When Mikhail II tried to compensate for the treaties by seeking an alliance with Lithuania, the army of Ivan III swiftly conquered Tver in 1485. The principality was then annexed by the Grand Duchy of Moscow.

References

Medieval Russia
Former countries in Europe
States and territories disestablished in 1485
Former principalities
Tver Oblast